Stephen Marc Breedlove (born 1954) is the Barnett Rosenberg professor of Neuroscience at Michigan State University in East Lansing, Michigan.  He was born and raised in the Ozarks of southwestern Missouri. After graduating from Central High School (Springfield, Missouri) in 1972, he earned a bachelor's degree in Psychology from Yale University in 1976, and a Ph.D. in psychology from UCLA in 1982. He was a professor of psychology at the University of California, Berkeley from 1982 to 2003, moving to Michigan State in 2001.  He works in the fields of Behavioral Neuroscience and Neuroendocrinology. He is a member of the Society for Neuroscience and the Society for Behavioral Neuroendocrinology, and a fellow of the Association for Psychological Science (APS) and the Biological Sciences section of the American Association for the Advancement of Science (AAAS).

Research
In numerous papers, Breedlove has demonstrated that steroid hormones and sexual behavior affect the developing and adult spinal cord and brain. He also reported that the average digit ratio of lesbians is more masculine than that of straight women, a finding that has been replicated in his and many other labs and which indicates that lesbians, on average, are exposed to more prenatal testosterone than are straight women. This finding joins many others that biological influences, such as prenatal testosterone and fraternal birth order, act before birth to affect the later unfolding of human sexual orientation, which is the theme for the documentary project Whom You Love.

He is sole author of two textbooks Principles of Psychology and Foundations of Neural Development and has co-authored textbooks in Biological Psychology and Behavioral Neuroendocrinology.

Breedlove, along with other neuroscientists, researched PTSD being connected to erectile dysfunction. This erectile dysfunction is usually treated by psychotherapy.  Breedlove helped to find the receptor that is affected by the PTSD. This was found through a series of stress tests on rats. The receptor is called the gastrin-releasing peptide (GRP) receptor. This receptor is stress-vulnerable and should be targeted in treatment.

He also researched how GRP in the lumbar spinal cord could be stimulated for the purpose of curing erectile dysfunction. It was found that the female rats and the male rats with erectile dysfunction had the same amount of GRP. Once the GRP was stimulated in the male rats, androgen receptors worked, and erectile dysfunction was cured. During the experiment, simple erections, dorsal flips of the penis and cup-like flaring erections of the distal glans were measured in the rats before and after probe stimulation.

Breedlove examined the sex differences in animals to gain an understanding of the sex differences in humans. It was found in rats that the males had more cell numbers in the spinal nucleus of the bulbocavernosus (SNB) than the female rats. These motor neurons appear in both male and female rats, but fade with age in the female rats. Testosterone was also found as the key hormone that is responsible for the differences between males and females.

Breedlove researched the sexual preferences of homosexual men. Using homosexual and heterosexual male participants, it was found that the two groups did not vary according to mating desires. Even though homosexual males cannot reproduce, they, like the heterosexual males, prefer to be with a younger partner. This concludes that both groups' partner references were independent of the evolutionary need for reproduction.'''

See also
Biology and sexual orientation
Prenatal hormones and sexual orientation
Sexual orientation

References

Further reading

External links
Public CV
TEDxMSU talk "Prenatal influences on human sexual orientation"
The Breedlove Jordan Lab Lab home page
Whom You Love documentary project
PDF files of selected papers
PubMed listing of scientific papers
Principles of Psychology Textbook author
Foundations of Neural Development Textbook author
Behavioral Neuroscience Textbook co-author
The Mind's Machine Textbook co-author
Biological Psychology Links Web page editor
Behavioral Endocrinology Textbook co-author
Summer School of Behavioral Neuroendocrinology Co-founder
Neuroscience Program at MSU
Is homosexuality a choice?
The Science of Sexual Orientation (60 Minutes)

Interview on biology of sexual orientation in the Washington Post
Google Scholar site
Society for Behavioral Neuroendocrinology
Society for Neuroscience

1954 births
Living people
People from Springfield, Missouri
21st-century American psychologists
Yale College alumni
University of California, Los Angeles alumni
University of California, Berkeley faculty
Michigan State University faculty
American neuroscientists
Fellows of the Association for Psychological Science
Fellows of the American Association for the Advancement of Science
20th-century American psychologists